Alexander Colin David Ingleby-Mackenzie OBE (15 September 1933 – 9 March 2006) was an English first-class cricketer: a left-handed batsman who played for Hampshire between 1951 and 1966, captaining the county from 1958 to 1965 as Hampshire's last amateur captain and leading his side to their first County Championship in the 1961 season. He was later president of the Marylebone Cricket Club from 1996 to 1998, during which time women were first permitted to join.

Early life
Ingleby-Mackenzie was born in Dartmouth, Devon, to Sir (Kenneth) Alexander Ingleby-Mackenzie (1892-1961), a surgeon officer in the Royal Navy who ended his career as a Vice-Admiral, and Violetta Constance, daughter of judge Amyas Philip Longstaffe.

He was educated at Ludgrove and Eton, where he became keeper of fives, squash, rackets, and the Field Game. He also played in the Wall Game, soccer, tennis, and cricket, playing three times in the annual cricket match against Harrow and for the public schools against the Combined Services. He was elected as President of Pop

Ingleby-Mackenzie played his first match for Hampshire in 1951, having been spotted at Eton by Desmond Eagar, although he was bowled for a duck by Alan Oakman in his debut innings.

First-class cricket career
He did National Service with the Royal Navy, during which time he played cricket for Combined Services and, on leave in the summer of 1952, for Hampshire.

He played a full season for Hampshire in 1954, then declined a place at Trinity College, Oxford to work for Slazenger, who gave him copious leave to pursue a parallel cricket career with Hampshire.

He toured the West Indies with a team led by E. W. Swanton in early 1956, and then headed the Hampshire batting averages in the 1956 County Championship season.

After sharing the county captaincy with Desmond Eagar in 1957, he became sole captain in 1958, in which year he was also named as the Cricket Writer's Club Young Cricketer of the Year.
His "day time" job also changed, accepting an invitation from Bryan Valentine of Kent to join the insurance brokers Holmwoods, Back and Manson.

Nevertheless, he was often absent pursuing his sport in a swashbuckling fashion. Hampshire's victory in the 1961 County Championship was, in part, due to Ingleby-Mackenzie's bold captaincy: 10 of their 19 victories that season are attributable to bold declarations on the third (and last) day, in a summer when the opposing team could not be made to follow-on. The team included West Indian opening batsman Roy Marshall, veteran swing and seam bowler Derek Shackleton, and fast bowler David White.

In his first-class career, he scored 12,421 first-class runs, including 11 hundreds, at a relatively low average of 24.35, this figure depressed at least in part because of his attacking instincts: in only one season (1956) when he played more than a handful of games did he average above 30. However, he passed 1,000 runs in a season five times.

He was an occasional right-arm off-break bowler (he never took a wicket) and an equally occasional wicket-keeper, who gained his only first-class stumping (that of Gerry Alexander) for the Duke of Norfolk's XI against Jamaica in the 1956–1957 West Indian cricket season, deputising for Leo Harrison.

He wrote his autobiography, Many a Slip, in 1962. John Arlott said the book "reflects a considerable capacity for the enjoyment of most pleasures ... [and] presents a picture of a young man engagingly carefree in a way that seems to belong to a different age from ours".

After cricket
He retired from first-class cricket in 1965, and later became chairman of Holmwoods. He led the firm through a 33 million pound management buyout from Brown Shipley in 1992 and oversaw the sale of the business to HSBC in 1997, becoming deputy chairman of HSBC Insurance Services.

He became cricket manager for Sir Paul Getty at his ground at Wormsley. He was reputedly one of the last to see Lord Lucan. He was a member of the Clermont Club and White's Club. He was also a life member of the All England Lawn Tennis and Croquet Club and he captained Sunningdale Golf Club in 2000.

Ingleby-Mackenzie served as president of Marylebone Cricket Club from 1996 to 1998.  He was in the post when the new media centre at Lord's was approved and building work began. He led a campaign in favour of women's membership, ultimately convincing members to vote in favour of the change in September 1998, after forcing two votes on the matter within seven months. He pronounced himself "absolutely delighted" at the decision. and he is famously quoted as saying "Women are a very fine species." He became president of Hampshire in 2002.

Personal life
He married Susan Marion Clifford-Turner in 1975; they had a daughter. He was awarded the OBE in the summer of 2005, just a few months before his death at the age of 72, following surgery for a brain tumour.  The hearse carrying his coffin passed beneath and adjacent to the stands as it circled Lord's Cricket Ground before making its way to Kensal Rise Crematorium. A memorial service was held on 29 June 2006 at St Paul's Cathedral which was attended by more than 1,600 people.

References

External links
 
 Statistical summary from CricketArchive
 Obituary (The Daily Telegraph, 15 March 2006)
 Obituary (The Guardian, 16 March 2006)

1933 births
2006 deaths
Royal Navy sailors
20th-century Royal Navy personnel
Military personnel from Devon
English cricketers
Hampshire cricketers
Hampshire cricket captains
Marylebone Cricket Club cricketers
Combined Services cricketers
Commonwealth XI cricketers
International Cavaliers cricketers
Officers of the Order of the British Empire
Presidents of the Marylebone Cricket Club
Gentlemen cricketers
Free Foresters cricketers
North v South cricketers
People educated at Eton College
People educated at Ludgrove School
People from Dartmouth, Devon
Deaths from brain cancer in England